Mohammed bin Naseeb Al-Habsi (born August 21, 1991) is an Omani swimmer, who specialized in breaststroke events. At age sixteen, Al-Habsi became one of the youngest swimmers to mark their official debut at the 2008 Summer Olympics in Beijing, competing in the men's 100 m breaststroke. Swimming against Qatar's Osama Mohammed Ye Alarag and the Cook Islands' Petero Okotai in the opening heat, Al-Habsi touched with a lifetime best of 1:12.28 to take the runner-up position by less than two seconds behind the Qatari swimmer Ye Alarag. Al-Habsi, however, failed to advance into the semi-finals, as he placed sixty-second in the overall rankings.

References

External links
 
NBC Olympics Profile

1991 births
Living people
Omani male swimmers
Olympic swimmers of Oman
Swimmers at the 2008 Summer Olympics
Male breaststroke swimmers
People from Muscat, Oman
Competitors at the 2013 Summer Universiade
Competitors at the 2015 Summer Universiade
Competitors at the 2017 Summer Universiade